Albert Thompson may refer to:

Albert Thompson (Australian politician) (1886–1973), Australian politician
Albert Thompson (Georgia politician), American politician and jurist 
Albert Meysey-Thompson (1848–1894), English footballer
Albert Thompson (footballer, born 1885) (1885–1956), English footballer
Albert Thompson (footballer, born 1912) (1912–?), Welsh footballer
Albert Thompson (sport shooter) (born 1952), Irish sports shooter
Albert C. Thompson (1842–1910), American judge
Albert G. Thompson (1928–2016), American educator and philanthropist

See also
Al Thompson (disambiguation)
Bert Thompson (disambiguation)